Mildred Elley is a private, for-profit college offering two-year programs as well as professional certifications with campuses in Albany, and New York City, New York and in Pittsfield, Massachusetts. Founded in 1917 by Augusta Mildred Elley, a local woman who was educated at a college in New York City, the school initially educated women for secretarial positions. With installation of a new president in 1985, the school expanded its programs and secured degree-granting authority from the Board of Regents of the University of the State of New York.

History

Mrs. Augusta Mildred Elley 
In 1917, a shortage of office workers throughout New York's Capital District occurred due to the United States entering World War I. Because of this, many positions that had previously been held by men were now opened up to women. As a result, many young women became excited about the opportunity to obtain the skills needed to fill these well-paying office positions.

Ms. Augusta Mildred Elley was known in the community as a woman of letters, which was not very common, in those days. She was educated at a private school in New York City, and she held a four-year college degree. Augusta was also a well-known suffragette and was well respected for her intellectual pursuits. For these reasons, a group of young women turned to her to teach typing and shorthand in her home at 245 Quail Street in Albany, NY.

Commercial establishment 
The first fifty students graduated from Mildred Elley's School in 1919. Soon after this, the school outgrew the Elley home and, in 1927, was moved to a commercial building at 227 Quail Street. This building was the home of educational and career opportunities for women in Albany, NY for nearly seventy years. In 2008, Mildred Elley returned to its roots and moved its home to 855 Central Avenue in Albany, where it still resides today. Mildred Elley's Albany campus shares campus space in the three-floor building with its sister school, Austin's School of Spa Technology.

New leadership 
Faith Ann Takes became President of Mildred Elley School in 1985, and it was under her leadership that the school entered an era where it saw the greatest change and growth. In just ten short years, enrollment grew from thirty-seven to over five hundred students. 1985 was also the year that Mildred Elley became co-educational.

Expansion to Pittsfield 
In 1991, after 70+ years of operation in Albany, NY, Mildred Elley School expanded and established a new campus in nearby Pittsfield, Massachusetts. The Pittsfield campus was originally intended to help dislocated workers get training as medical assistants.

Mildred Elley's Pittsfield campus eventually realized that there was a need to add more programs in order to meet the demands of the modern business community in the Berkshire area. A variety of new programs have since been developed, and in 2005, the campus began offering credit-bearing certificate programs, much the same as the offerings at the long-standing Albany campus.

Today the Pittsfield campus offers a large number of advanced job and career training programs as well as a variety of certificate programs. Programs offered include Business Management, Cosmetology, Massage Therapy, Information Technology, Medical Assisting, Paralegal Studies, Practical Nurse and even Early Childhood Education.

In 2014, Mildred Elley relocated the Pittsfield Campus to a brand new building at 100 West Street, downtown.

Academics

The college is currently divided into three divisions: School of Business and Technology; School of Health and Wellness Professions; and the Extension School.  The programs offered are primarily career-oriented and target graduates' integration into the workforce; however, several articulation agreements with local state and private college in New York allow graduates to acquire advanced standing at four-year institutions.

References

External links

Two-year colleges in the United States
Private universities and colleges in Massachusetts
Private universities and colleges in New York (state)
Educational institutions established in 1917
For-profit universities and colleges in the United States
Universities and colleges in Berkshire County, Massachusetts
Buildings and structures in Pittsfield, Massachusetts
1917 establishments in New York (state)